In zoological nomenclature, a subphylum is a taxonomic rank below the rank of phylum.

The taxonomic rank of "subdivision" in fungi and plant taxonomy is equivalent to "subphylum" in zoological taxonomy. Some plant taxonomists have also used the rank of subphylum, for instance monocotyledons as a subphylum of phylum Angiospermae and vertebrates as a subphylum of phylum Chordata.

Taxonomic rank 
Subphylum is:
subordinate to the phylum 
superordinate to the infraphylum.

Where convenient, subphyla in turn can be divided into infraphyla; in turn such an infraphylum also would be superordinate to any classes or superclasses in the hierarchy.

Examples 
Not all fauna phyla are divided into subphyla. Those that are include: 
Arthropoda: divided into subphyla Trilobitomorpha, Chelicerata, Myriapoda, Hexapoda and Crustacea,
Brachiopoda: divided into subphyla Linguliformea, Craniformea and Rhynchonelliformea,
Chordata: divided into Tunicata, Cephalochordata, and its largest subphylum Vertebrata.

Examples of infraphyla include the Mycetozoa, the Gnathostomata and the Agnatha.

References

Bibliography 

 
Biology terminology
rank03